Michael Yani (born December 31, 1980) is a former American tennis player. He turned professional in 2003.

Yani is 6 ft 1 in (185 cm) and 75 kg (165 lb). He resides in Honolulu, Hawaii.  After attending on a tennis scholarship, he graduated from Duke University in Durham, North Carolina, where he won All-America honors in 2002 and 2003, and was a 4-year letterman.  He went to high school at Saint Andrews in Boca Raton, Florida. His high singles ranking to date is world No. 143, which he reached March 1, 2010.

Yani qualified for the 2009 Wimbledon Championships and 2009 U.S. Open, but lost both times in the first round in straight sets.  At the 2010 French Open, he lost a tight match in the first round against Lukáš Lacko, with the score at 6–4, 6–7(5), 6–7(4), 7–6(5), 12–10.

Performance timeline

Singles

ATP Challenger and ITF Futures finals

Singles: 14 (7–7)

Doubles: 14 (9–5)

References

External links
 
 
 
 Wimbledon profile

American male tennis players
American people of Singaporean descent
American people of Chinese descent
American sportspeople of Singaporean descent
Duke Blue Devils men's tennis players
Sportspeople from Durham, North Carolina
Tennis people from North Carolina
Living people
1980 births